Aongatete is a settlement and rural community in the Western Bay of Plenty District and Bay of Plenty Region of New Zealand's North Island. It is located on State Highway 2, south of Katikati and north-west of Ōmokoroa. The landscape consists of a long valley descending into the Tauranga Harbour.

The local Kaimai Mamaku Conservation Park, managed by the Department of Conservation, including walks through puriri and kohekohe forest, along the Aongatete Stream, and to swimming holes. Ngai Tamawhariua are guardians of the 500 hectare native forest, and a Forest and Bird volunteer group helps maintain it. A restoration trust was established in 2006 to trap or poison pests like stoats, rats, cats and possums.

The Aongatete Lodge and Outdoor Education Centre, located in the forest, hosts school camps and events like the International Juggling Association Oceania Competition.

The settlement includes Aongatete Coolstores, a kiwifruit orcharding, packing and coolstore business. Seeka Limited, a produce company listed on the NZX, purchased the business for $25 million in March 2019.

Vodafone installed a cell tower at Aongatete in January 2014. Ultra fast broadband internet was introduced to Aongatete in December 2019.

During the 2020 Covid-19 lockdown, a local couple tried to cheer up the community with humorous displays featuring teddy bears.

Demographics

Aongatete had a population of 3,279 at the 2018 New Zealand census, an increase of 486 people (17.4%) since the 2013 census, and an increase of 714 people (27.8%) since the 2006 census. There were 1,287 households, comprising 1,641 males and 1,641 females, giving a sex ratio of 1.0 males per female. The median age was 51.2 years (compared with 37.4 years nationally), with 510 people (15.6%) aged under 15 years, 381 (11.6%) aged 15 to 29, 1,593 (48.6%) aged 30 to 64, and 792 (24.2%) aged 65 or older.

Ethnicities were 89.2% European/Pākehā, 11.2% Māori, 1.7% Pacific peoples, 3.1% Asian, and 2.1% other ethnicities. People may identify with more than one ethnicity.

The percentage of people born overseas was 20.0, compared with 27.1% nationally.

Although some people chose not to answer the census's question about religious affiliation, 57.5% had no religion, 30.7% were Christian, 1.3% had Māori religious beliefs, 0.4% were Hindu, 0.1% were Muslim, 0.7% were Buddhist and 1.9% had other religions.

Of those at least 15 years old, 474 (17.1%) people had a bachelor's or higher degree, and 492 (17.8%) people had no formal qualifications. The median income was $30,500, compared with $31,800 nationally. 465 people (16.8%) earned over $70,000 compared to 17.2% nationally. The employment status of those at least 15 was that 1,332 (48.1%) people were employed full-time, 528 (19.1%) were part-time, and 72 (2.6%) were unemployed.

Education

The school was established in 1988 and is governed by the Matahui Road School Charitable Trust.

References

Western Bay of Plenty District
Populated places in the Bay of Plenty Region
Populated places around the Tauranga Harbour